The interposed nucleus is part of the deep cerebellar complex and is composed of the globose nucleus and the emboliform nucleus. It is located in the roof (dorsal aspect) of the fourth ventricle, lateral to the fastigial nucleus. It receives its afferent supply from the anterior lobe of the cerebellum and sends output via the superior cerebellar peduncle to the red nucleus.

The interposed nucleus is located in the paravermis of the cerebellum. It receives input from the ipsilateral posterior external arcuate fibers (cuneocerebellar tract) and the dorsal spinocerebellar tract, which originate in the accessory cuneate nucleus and the posterior thoracic nucleus, respectively. The interposed nucleus is responsible for coordinating agonist/antagonist muscle pairs, and therefore a lesion in this area causes tremor.

The interposed nucleus is smaller than the dentate but larger than the fastigial nucleus.

Function
Functionally, it modulates muscle stretch reflexes of proximal limb muscles. The cerebellar interpositus nucleus is also required in delayed Pavlovian conditioning.

References

External links
 https://web.archive.org/web/20080405060224/http://www.lib.mcg.edu/edu/eshuphysio/program/section8/8ch6/s8ch6_30.htm
 http://www.neuroanatomy.wisc.edu/cere/text/P5/interp.htm

Cerebellum